Alexander Allan Crowe (24 November 1924 – 3 May 1997) was a Scottish footballer who played as an inside forward. He appeared in the Scottish Football League for St Mirren, and in England's Football League for Ipswich Town. Crowe was heavily involved in Ipswich's promotion to the Second Division as champions of the Third Division South in the 1953–54 season.

References

1924 births
1997 deaths
Footballers from Motherwell
Association football inside forwards
Scottish footballers
St Mirren F.C. players
Ipswich Town F.C. players
Stowmarket Town F.C. players
Scottish Football League players
Scottish Junior Football Association players
English Football League players